This is a list of mines in the Northwest Territories and includes both operating and closed mines. The list does not include mines that were operating prior to 1999
in what is now Nunavut.

See also
List of mines in British Columbia
List of mines in Nunavut

Notes

References

 
Northwest Territories